This list of Gazania cultivars includes plant cultivars of the South African genus Gazania.

See also
Lists of cultivars

References

Garden plants of Africa
Drought-tolerant plants
Groundcovers
Lists of cultivars